The University of Santo Tomas is a private Catholic research university in Manila, Philippines. Founded in 1611 by the Order of Preachers, it is the oldest university in the Philippines and Asia. The university gives numerous awards, honors, prizes, and recognitions to its people and the general public who have substantial accomplishments or have exemplified the ideals of UST.

List of awards
 Dangal ng UST Awards (Honor of UST Awards) — set of awards given to faculty members who excelled in their respective fields
 Gawad Ustetika (Grant Ustetika) — recognizes the works of aspiring Thomasian student and alumni writers. Ustetika is portmanteau of the words “USTé”, colloquial name of the university, and “estetika” (aesthetics). Some of the categories are as follows.
 Parangal Hagbong (Award Laureate)— awarded to UST alumni for lifetime achievement in letters Hagbong is from an old Tagalog word meaning laureate.
 Rector’s Literary Award — awarded for literary works that best reflect the Catholic vision
 Hiyas ng UST Awards (Gem of UST Awards) — set of awards given to the university support staff
 The Outstanding Thomasian Alumni Awards — set of awards given to Thomasian alumni in recognition of their significant contribution to the society and Church
 USTv Awards — awarded to television shows and personalities who convey responsible television content

Student awards
The university recognizes academic achievers, student leaders, and organizations annually on UST Student Awards Day. Medals and certificates are awarded to students under the following categories:

 Rector’s Academic Award — awarded to students who obtained the highest scholastic rating for whole program
 Pope Leo XIII Community Development Award — awarded for active involvement in community development
 Quezon Leadership Award — awarded for exceptional leadership
 Benavides Outstanding Achievement Award — awarded for outstanding achievement in academic or scientific field
 Pope John Paul II Outstanding Achievement Award — awarded for outstanding achievement in sports and arts field
 St. Dominic de Guzman Award — awarded for outstanding teamwork
 St. Albertus Magnus Award — awarded for outstanding research work
 St. Thomas Aquinas Award — awarded for exceptionally outstanding performance
 Tradition of Excellence Award — awarded for exemplary performance of a student organization on a sustained level by having been granted the same award for five consecutive years

References